Smolin (masculine) or Smolina (feminine) is a last name shared by the following people:
Anna Smolina (b. 1994), Russian tennis player
Barry Smolin (b. 1961), American radio host, composer, and writer
David M. Smolin, American law professor
Ivan Smolin (fl. 1920), commander of the Soviet 21st Rifle Division
John A. Smolin (b. 1967), American physicist
Lee Smolin (b. 1955), American theoretical physicist
Svetlana Smolina, Russian pianist
Yefim Smolin, Russian glass-maker

See also
Smolin Gallery, defunct avant-garde art venue in New York City, United States
Smolino (disambiguation)